The Mürtschenstock is a mountain massif of the Glarus Alps, overlooking the Walensee in the canton of Glarus. It is composed of several summits, of which the highest (named Ruchen) has an elevation of 2,441 metres above sea level. The two other main summits are the Stock (2,390 m) and the Fulen (2,410 m) .

References

External links

 Mürtschenstock on Hikr

Mountains of the Alps
Mountains of Switzerland
Glarus thrust
Mountains of the canton of Glarus
Two-thousanders of Switzerland